The Men's 1986 World Amateur Boxing Championships were held in Reno, United States from May 8 to 18. The fourth edition of this competition, held two years before the Summer Olympics in Seoul, South Korea, was organised by the world governing body for amateur boxing AIBA.

Medal table

Medal winners 

 Puerto Rican Louis Rolon (48 Kg) and American Lauren Ross (81 Kg) were disqualified for doping violations.

External links 
Results on Amateur Boxing

World Amateur Boxing Championships
AIBA World Boxing Championships
B
Sports competitions in Reno, Nevada
Boxing Championships
World Amateur Boxing Championships
World Amateur Boxing Championships
Boxing in Nevada